Metaschizotherium is an extinct genus that belongs to the family Chalicotheriidae, which was a group of herbivorous perissodactyl ("odd-toed") mammals. Though found primarily in Europe, fragmentary remains suggest that their range extended into Asia. 

Several other species have been described under Metaschizotherium in the past, including the African M. transvaalensis, but they have been transferred to other genera, such as Ancylotherium. The entire genus has been considered synonymous with Ancylotherium in the past, but nowadays the two are generally found to be distinct.

This genus is typically associated with areas of closed, moist forest, where it fed on relatively soft leaves and shoots compared to a more abrasive diet of twigs and bark.

See also
Moropus
Ancylotherium

References

 
Miocene extinctions
Extinct mammals of Europe
Miocene mammals of Europe
Fossil taxa described in 1932